Starhunter (and in the original Season Two Starhunter 2300) is a Canadian science fiction television series that aired for two seasons. The series was produced in Canada by The Danforth Studios Ltd. (a D'or/Jackson Company) in association with Alliance Atlantis with some photography in the United Kingdom. Grosvenor Park Productions UK Ltd. was the co-producer from the United Kingdom, and Le Sabre SA, an affiliate of Canal+, was the French co-producer, with major unofficial German participation by Das Werk.

In season one, Starhunter starred Michael Paré, Tanya Allen, Claudette Roche and featured Murray Melvin and Stephen Marcus. In season two Clive Robertson, Dawn Stern and Paul Fox were added to the cast, while the original actors except Marcus were dropped. Contrary to the wishes of the series creators, the investors in the second season blocked the return of Paré and replaced Melvin.

Season one was nominated by the Directors Guild of Canada for a Best Production Design award, and for a "Spaceys Award" by Space: The Imagination Station.

The first run of the first season aired in Canada, from 1 November 2000 to 28 March 2001. Starhunter was syndicated in the United States by Western International Syndication, going to air in the fall of 2002. The first season continues to re-run in many territories. The second season had its first run in Canada from 9 August 2003 to 3 April 2004.

The name of the series was changed in the second season to Starhunter 2300, although in the US, both seasons share the same title.  For season one, special effects were handled by Das Werk from Germany.  For season two, they were handled by Optix Digital Pictures in Toronto, Canada.  Music for the show's opening credits was composed by Donald Quan for the first season and by Peter Gabriel for the second season.

Plot
Starhunter follows the exploits of the crew of a retired luxury-liner refitted to serve a late-23rd century bounty-hunting crew, led by Dante Montana (Paré). The owning company's name, "Trans-Utopia Cruiseship HHS", was painted on her side but has faded, leaving some letters readable while obliterating others. The letters that remain have become her nickname, so she is casually known to the crew as the "Tulip". Non crew people and space transport hubs generally refer to the ship as the "Trans-Utopian".

In the first season, Tulip is owned by Rudolpho deLuna who has hired Dante Montana as a bounty hunter. Dante took the job to provide a means of traveling while also financing the search for his son, Travis, who was abducted a decade prior by a group of brigands called Raiders. Aiding him are the ship's engineer Percy Montana (Dante's niece) and security officer Lucrecia Scott, a former marine added to the crew by deLuna to keep Dante focused on the missions given him.  Lucrecia has a hidden agenda, as an operative for a mysterious organization called "The Orchard". The Orchard comprises scientists and researchers dedicated to unlocking, in hopes of controlling, alien genes called "The Divinity Cluster".

When broadcast in Canada each episode began with a long message transmission from deLuna (usually to Dante) outlining Dante's current assignment and deLuna's philosophical thoughts about it. In the United States, these monologues were removed.

In the second season, the show was restructured (and retconned). Percy Montana emerges from hyperspace unaged, while fifteen years have passed in the outside universe. No characters remain in the show from the first season except deLuna. He attempts to assert ownership of the Tulip but since he collected on the ship's insurance when the Tulip was presumed lost, the insurance company now legally owns her. Percy claims ownership by salvage when the company shuts down. Travis Montana, Dante's son and Percy's cousin, joins the crew along with his sidekick Marcus Fagen. DeLuna brings Callista Larkadia, another bounty hunter. Percy describes the four as the "pretend cousin, big fat sleaze, little buddy, [and] mystery slut".

Cancelled subsequent seasons

The show did not continue in production after season two despite pre-orders from US, European, Canadian and Pacific Rim broadcasters for a third season, leaving the story at a cliffhanger. In the season finale, Tulip is trapped in hyperspace. As the countdown to implement the crew's desperate measure to return to the normal universe reaches zero, the show cuts to black and the credits roll.

Creators and producers G. Philip Jackson and Daniel D'or left the series during the second season over business differences within the executive team of the parent company Greystone Studios International Inc., and went on to develop the science fiction television series and video game Ice Planet. Jackson was an uncredited writer on eight of Starhunter's second-season episodes.

Posts on Sept 19 2014, on the website and Facebook Group of the film production company "Starfield Indie", state that the company has acquired rights to go forward with a third season of Starhunter, also being 22 one-hour episodes. A production date is not announced, except the Facebook group posts refer to a "best guess" of production starting in "February 2015".  The same posts represent that the series will bring back most of Season one and Two regulars including explicitly Michael Pare.  Unspecified new cast is apparently to be added to the ensemble according to the same source.

Starhunter ReduX

On Tuesday 29 May 2018, Starhunter: ReduX, an updated and expanded version of seasons one and two featuring updated special effects, newly-shot footage and a 4K transfer in a 16:9 aspect ratio (the original was filmed in 16x9 anamorphic, but only released as 4:3), premiered on El Rey Network across the USA. Among changes in Starhunter REDUX are some actor updates. Except for a brief moment in Episode 201R, actor Graham Harley has been replaced by the original Caravaggio actor Murray Melvin. Michael Pare appears in parts of the second season (he didn't in the original Season 2) and the character Penny Montana is played by original actress from season one, Heidi von Paleske. An extended scene was added with an older Tanya Allen as Percy Montana. These changes, involving CGI, green-screen and other processes were made as a part of bringing Starhunter: ReduX closer to the creators' original vision for Season two.

The process seems to continue. "Starfield CreatorCo" (a new brand of Starfield Indie) is re-launching a further updated version of Starhunter REDUX on Amazon Prime on or about July 25, 2021 in the USA and UK, with Canada, India and Australia following in short order. This streaming release to be followed by a physical Media (Blu Ray and DVD) release worldwide about 3 months later. This further refreshed version is continuing in a reveal of further backstory integrated in prior Starhunter REDUX episodes.

Cast

First season
 Michael Paré: Dante Montana
 Tanya Allen: Percy Montana
 Claudette Roche: Lucretia "Luc" Scott
 Murray Melvin: Caravaggio
 Stephen Marcus: Rudolpho deLuna

Second season
 Clive Robertson: Travis Montana
 Tanya Allen: Percy Montana
 Dawn Stern: Callista "Callie" Larkadia
 Paul Fox: Marcus Fagen
 Stephen Marcus: Rudolpho deLuna
 Graham Harley: Briefly as Caravaggio
 Murray Melvin: Caravaggio (Starhunter REDUX version of season two)
 Michael Paré: Dante Montana

Episodes

Series overview

Season 1 (2000–01)
{{Episode table
|background=#FF5F5F
|overall= 
|title=
|director=
|writer=
|airdate=
|prodcode = 
|episodes=

{{Episode list
|Title= The Man Who Sold the World
|DirectedBy= Luc Chalifour
|WrittenBy= Julian Fikus
|OriginalAirDate= 
| ProdCode =  105 | EpisodeNumber = 5
|ShortSummary= Dante and Luc go after a ruthless war criminal named Novak who is hiding on Pluto, a man Luc says she has a personal vendetta against for his involvement in the civil war on Callisto. In reality, her father Darius wants Luc to uncover Novak's deadly experiments with the Divinity Cluster. In an effort to avoid capture, Novak uploads a chaotic A.I. virus called "Billy Ray" to the Tulip that battles the Tulip'''s A.I. "Caravaggio," for control of the ship.
|LineColor=FF5F5F
}}

}}

Season 2 (2003–04)
{{Episode table
|background=#0000FF
|overall= 
|title=
|director=
|writer=
|airdate=
|prodcode = 
|episodes=

{{Episode list
|Title= Hyperspace I
|DirectedBy= Rodger Gartland
|WrittenBy= Hudson King
|OriginalAirDate= 
| ProdCode =  221 | EpisodeNumber = 43
|ShortSummary= While trying to solve the problems of hyperspace, Marcus finds help in the theories of a Dr. Gregory Lanzig and decides to track him down. Lanzig proves hard to find, but Travis and Callie find his assistant Dr. Vienna Xeylon and learn she and Lanzig are one and the same. Xeylon offers a device called a horizon generator which once installed in the Tulip' will help create a stable warp bubble. Soon, Orchard agents come for Xeylon, and Callie is shot during the ensuing firefight. Callie later dies from a powerful toxin carried by the bullet that destroys muscle tissue. Not wanting Callie's death to be for nothing, Travis and Marcus infiltrate The Orchard's facility on Mars and free Xeylon, but Tristan Catchpole returns and chases the Tulip down. The only chance left for escape is to try Xeylon's device and enter hyperspace.
|LineColor=0000FF
}}

}}

Additional information
 Season two's theme song, Darker Star, was performed by Peter Gabriel. It is the instrumental version of the song Darkness from the 2002 album Up.
 Through 2006 and 2007, Starhunter 2300 aired on A-Channel (a Canadian television network) from 3:30-4:40 AM every weeknight.
 Starhunter was available on Joost for viewers outside Canada although some story-critical episodes are absent from the Joost site. Joost also presents the episodes in incorrect order (beginning with the sixth episode) rendering the broad story and character arcs difficult to follow. Joost
 Starhunter Season 2 was available on Netflix's Watch-It-Now streaming service until November 1, 2011.

Home releases
The two seasons of Starhunter are released separately on Region 1 DVDs, with each package bearing the somewhat misleading legend "The Complete Series."

Much of the first season of Starhunter was first made available across two single-disc releases from Echo Bridge Home Entertainment. "Volume 1" contains 8 episodes and "Volume 2" holds an additional seven episodes. Both were released August 31, 2004.

Echo Bridge later released the complete first season as "Starhunter: The Complete Series" on May 29, 2007 in a 4-disc set."Starhunter: The Complete Series (DVD series review)" by UncleGeoff at www.sfcrowsnest.info
The set is presented in production order rather than original broadcast order, a difference which only affects the first six episodes. Given the largely standalone nature of each of these early episodes the exact viewing order doesn't matter much, except that it does place the intended series opener "The Divinity Cluster" as episode 4 instead of episode 1.

In 2008 Echo Bridge reissued the first season in a 3-disc set.  The first DVD still reflects the incorrect episode order listed above and is still mislabeled as "The Complete Series." The cover art was modified slightly, using mostly the same basic imagery as the previous 4-disc set but giving it a pronounced red color scheme as opposed to the mostly dark blue color scheme used on the previous 4-disc set.

Alliance Home Entertainment released season one in a 4-disc DVD set in Canada as Starhunter: The Complete Series'' on April 19, 2011. Packaging and disc content appear to be largely identical to the previous 4-disc Echo Bridge release, including the incorrect episode order for the first six episodes.

Image Entertainment released the complete second season under the title "Starhunter 2300: The Complete Series" on November 23, 2004 in a 6-disc set.

The first season was also released on DVD in Germany in 2010 across a pair of 2-disc sets, each covering 11 episodes. These German releases are notable for presenting the first season in true widescreen, whereas all other DVD releases of these episodes are of a standard cropped 'fullscreen' presentation. Season 2 is currently unavailable in widescreen.

References

External links

 Starhunter Redux at starfieldcreatorco.com
 

2000 Canadian television series debuts
2004 Canadian television series endings
Canadian adventure television series
2000s Canadian drama television series
2000s Canadian science fiction television series
Space adventure television series
English-language television shows
Television series set in the 23rd century